John Howard Louis Lecompte (July 28, 1914 – February 21, 1970) was a Canadian ice hockey player. He was a member of the Ottawa RCAF Flyers who won the gold medal in ice hockey for Canada at the 1948 Winter Olympics in St. Moritz.

References

External links
John Lecompte at databaseOlympics
Louis Lecompte at Archives Canada

1914 births
1970 deaths
Ice hockey players at the 1948 Winter Olympics
Olympic gold medalists for Canada
Olympic ice hockey players of Canada
Olympic medalists in ice hockey
Medalists at the 1948 Winter Olympics
Canadian ice hockey defencemen